The Batasang Bayan was the consultative assembly and legislative advisory council in the Philippines that helped formulate decrees promulgated by Ferdinand Marcos from its inauguration on September 21, 1976 to October 30, 1978.

"As such powers and functions shall consist of but not limited to assisting and advising the President of his lawmaking functions, providing a forum for the citizenry, through the herein designated representatives, to ventilate their views on national issues, as well as their opinions on the manner of administering the affairs of the government, providing a forum for the rationalization, unification, and clarification on the policies and programs of the Executive Branch of Government and providing a mechanism for actually conducting a review of the structures, policies and efficiencies of the different Barangays and Sanggunians and submit its finding and recommendations to the President as mandated by the 1973 Constitution as the Philippines shifted from a presidential to a parliamentary form of government and Presidential Decree No. 995." It held its regular and special sessions at the Philippine International Convention Center.

Sessions
Regular Session: September 21, 1976 – October 30, 1978

Leadership

President
Ferdinand Marcos

Secretary of Local Governments
Jose A. Roño, Jr.

Floor Leader

Functions
The Batasang Bayan functioned as a legislative advisory council to the President on legislative matters. Powers and functions consisted of:

 Assisting and advising the President of his lawmaking functions;
 Providing a forum for the citizenry, through the herein designated representatives, to ventilate their views on national issues, as well as their opinions on the manner of administering the affairs of the government;
 Providing a forum for the rationalization, unification, and clarification on the policies and programs of the Executive Branch of Government;
 Providing a mechanism for actually conducting a review of the structures, policies and efficiencies of the different Barangays and Sanggunians and submit its finding and recommendations to the President.

Members
The Batasang Bayan was composed of 128 members, all appointive. Representation came from the highest government entity down to the smallest local government unit (barangay) and the marginalized sectors of society. Particularly, it was composed of the following:
President of the Republic of the Philippines, the members of the Cabinet, including officials with the rank of Cabinet.
Provincial governors, city mayors, presidents of regional associations of Barangay and Kabataang Barangay Councils.
Sectoral representatives of professional, capital-industrial and agricultural.

See also
Congress of the Philippines
Senate of the Philippines
House of Representatives of the Philippines

References

External links

Further reading
Philippine House of Representatives Congressional Library

Historical legislatures in the Philippines
Fourth Philippine Republic
Establishments by Philippine presidential decree